Dexter Grant Kernich-Drew (born 16 October 1991) is an Australian professional basketball player for the Waverley Falcons of the NBL1 South. The Melbourne-born guard played four years of college basketball for Washington State before starting his professional career in 2015. After a stint in Brazil, he returned to Australia where he joined the Perth Wildcats in 2016.

Early life and career
Kernich-Drew was born and raised in Melbourne, Victoria. He attended Caulfield Grammar School, where he competed in basketball, volleyball and track and field. He led the school's basketball team to the 2008 McDonald's Cup Senior Boys State Championship, where he was named the tournament MVP. Caulfield went on to capture the National School Basketball Tournament (NSBT) Championship, defeating Mountain Creek State High School.

In 2009, Kernich-Drew played for the Waverley Falcons in the Big V Youth League Division 1. In 15 games for Waverley during the year, he averaged 23.3 points, 7.3 rebounds, 3.2 assists and 1.1 steals per game. He was subsequently named Player of the Year. He also played for Waverley the following year in the same league, averaging 24.8 points, 4.8 rebounds, 3.1 assists and 1.2 steals in 12 games.

College career
In May 2010, Kernich-Drew signed a Financial Aid Agreement with Washington State University in order to join the school's men's basketball team for the 2010–11 season. However, he ultimately redshirted the 2010–11 season and joined the Cougars for the 2011–12 season as a freshman.

In his freshman season, Kernich-Drew appeared in 30 of the team's 37 games, while earning one starting assignment and averaging 2.3 points per game. He recorded career highs with 10 points and five rebounds in 22 minutes against Eastern Washington on 3 December 2011.

As a sophomore in 2012–13, Kernich-Drew played in 32 games for the Cougars, including 14 starts. He averaged 23.3 minutes, 6.4 points and 2.4 rebounds per game. He scored a career-high 16 points against Texas A&M on 20 November 2012, and played a career-high 39 minutes at home against UCLA on 6 March 2013. In the UCLA contest, he led the Cougars with a career-high 11 rebounds and scored 11 points for his only double-double of the season.

As a junior in 2013–14, Kernich-Drew appeared in 30 games for the Cougars, notching 21 starts. He averaged 22.2 minutes, 6.3 points, 0.8 assists, and 1.7 rebounds per game, and scored in double digits six times. He scored a season high and career-best 24 points against Colorado on 8 January 2014 after missing his only game of the season a week earlier due to a concussion.

As a senior in 2014–15, Kernich-Drew played in all 31 games for the Cougars, notching 12 starts. He averaged 18.9 minutes, 6.6 points, 1.6 rebounds, and 0.6 assists per game. He came on strong at the end of the season and ranked sixth in the Pac-12 with a .433 (42-for-97) three-point clip. He had a career-high 27 points in WSU's win over Arizona State at home on 13 February 2015, and scored 20 points and tied his career high with six three-pointers at home against Arizona two days later.

In 123 games for the Cougars over four seasons, Kernich-Drew amassed averages of 5.4 points and 1.6 rebounds in 18.3 minutes per game.

Professional career

Big V and Brazil (2015–2016)
After graduating from Washington State University, Kernich-Drew returned to Australia and joined the Melbourne Tigers of the Big V State Championship division in June 2015. He appeared in nine games for the Tigers over two months, averaging 22.9 points, 5.2 rebounds, 1.8 assists and 1.0 steals per game.

In September 2015, Kernich-Drew signed with Brazilian team Minas for the 2015–16 season. However, after appearing in just four games, he parted ways with Minas in November 2015 and returned to Australia. Upon returning home, he was touted as a possible injury-replacement player for Damian Martin of the Perth Wildcats—Kernich-Drew had trained with the Wildcats during preseason and was offered a contract, but he chose to play in Brazil instead. While he did not end up joining the team as Martin's replacement, Kernich-Drew remained with the Wildcats for the rest of the season as a training player.

In December 2015, Kernich-Drew signed with the Waverley Falcons of the Big V State Championship division for the 2016 season. In 21 games for Waverley in 2016, he averaged 15.6 points, 3.2 rebounds and 1.5 assists per game. He was named a finalist for the Defensive Player of the Year award, but he ultimately missed out.

Perth Wildcats (2016–2018)

On 29 July 2016, Kernich-Drew signed a two-year deal with the Perth Wildcats of the National Basketball League. He joined a Wildcats team attempting to defend their title in 2016–17, after he himself was amongst the playing group during their championship run in 2015–16. Early-season injuries saw Kernich-Drew have a break-out performance in just his sixth NBL game on 28 October 2016. The three-point specialist spent a career-high 17 minutes on the court and made four of his seven attempts – all of which came from outside the arc – to finish with 14 points in an 81–76 loss to the Illawarra Hawks in Wollongong. The Wildcats slumped to last on the ladder with a 7–9 record following a loss to the Adelaide 36ers on 22 December 2016. In a crucial game against Illawarra in Wollongong on New Year's Eve, Kernich-Drew emerged as an unlikely hero to inspire Perth to a crucial against-the-odds victory. He exploded for eight of his 13 points in the final term to help lead the Wildcats to a 95–87 win over the Hawks. The Wildcats went on to finish the regular season in third place with a 15–13 record and made it through to the NBL Grand Final where they faced Illawarra. In the best-of-five series, the Wildcats were successful in sweeping the Hawks 3–0 to claim their second consecutive championship and eighth in total. Kernich-Drew appeared in 29 of the team's 33 games in 2016–17, averaging 2.3 points in 5.9 minutes per game.

On 9 May 2017, Kernich-Drew signed with the Rockingham Flames of the State Basketball League for the rest of the 2017 season. He made his debut for the Flames three days later, recording 12 points, six rebounds and four steals in a 67–64 win over the East Perth Eagles. On 19 May 2017, he scored a game-high 25 points in a 78–73 win over the Joondalup Wolves. On 27 May 2017, he recorded a game-high 27 points and 11 rebounds in an 84–79 loss to the Geraldton Buccaneers. On 2 June 2017, he scored a season-high 29 points in an 88–86 loss to the Cockburn Cougars. On 8 July 2017, he set a new season high with 38 points in a 105–103 win over East Perth. On 17 July 2017, he was ruled out for the rest of the SBL season after suffering a broken jaw against the Perry Lakes Hawks three days earlier. In 10 games for the Flames, he averaged 21.0 points, 5.2 rebounds and 2.5 assists per game.

In the Wildcats' second game of the 2017–18 season on 13 October 2017, Kernich-Drew had 11 points in just 10 minutes against the Illawarra Hawks. He failed to surpass that mark for the rest of the season, finishing with averages of 2.2 points in 5.2 minutes per game over 21 contests. The Wildcats finished the regular season in third place with a 16–12, before losing 2–0 to the Adelaide 36ers in the semi-finals. Following the NBL season, Kernich-Drew played in the Rockingham Flames' 2018 season opener.

Melbourne Tigers (2018)
On 20 January 2018, Kernich-Drew signed with the Melbourne Tigers for the 2018 SEABL season. In 11 games, he averaged 22.6 points, 4.3 rebounds and 4.0 assists per game.

Cairns Taipans (2018–2019)
On 9 May 2018, Kernich-Drew signed with the Cairns Taipans. On 13 December 2018, he was ruled out for six weeks after being diagnosed with multiple undisplaced fractures around his eye socket and cheekbone. In 18 games for the Taipans in 2018–19, he averaged 3.3 points and 1.5 rebounds per game.

Dandenong Rangers (2019)
In March 2019, Kernich-Drew signed with the Dandenong Rangers for the inaugural NBL1 season. In 15 games, he averaged 17.6 points, 2.8 rebounds, 2.0 assists and 1.1 steals per game.

Melbourne United and Geelong Supercats (2019–2020)
After training with Melbourne United throughout 2019, Kernich-Drew was signed by the team as an injury replacement for David Barlow on 2 October, on the eve of the 2019–20 NBL season. He did not appear in a game for United during his stint with the team.

On 15 October 2019, Kernich-Drew signed with the Geelong Supercats for the 2020 NBL1 season. The season was cancelled due to the COVID-19 pandemic.

Sydney Kings (2021)
On 5 February 2021, Kernich-Drew signed with the Sydney Kings as an injury replacement for Angus Glover.

Waverley Falcons (2021–present)
In April 2021, Kernich-Drew signed a two-year deal with the Waverley Falcons of the NBL1 South.

Personal
Kernich-Drew is the son of Maurice and Margaret, and has a younger sister, Marli.

References

External links

Dexter Kernich-Drew at nbl1.com.au
Dexter Kernich-Drew at lnb.com.br 
Dexter Kernich-Drew at wsucougars.com
Dexter Kernich-Drew at cougcenter.com
"Dexter Aims to Unleash Venom with Snakes" at nbl.com.au

1991 births
Living people
Australian men's basketball players
Australian expatriate basketball people in the United States
Cairns Taipans players
Guards (basketball)
Minas Tênis Clube basketball players
Perth Wildcats players
Basketball players from Melbourne
Sydney Kings players
Washington State Cougars men's basketball players